Laagblokland is a former hamlet in the Dutch province of South Holland. It was located in the former municipality of Graafstroom, between the villages of Molenaarsgraaf and Ottoland.

Laagblokland was a separate municipality between 1817 and 1857, when it merged with Ottoland.

References

Former municipalities of South Holland
Molenlanden